Dániel Nagy may refer to:

 Dániel Nagy (footballer, born 1984), Hungarian football right winger for BFC Siófok
 Dániel Nagy (footballer, born 1991), football midfielder for Újpest and Hungary
 Dániel Nagy (racing driver) (born 1998), Hungarian racing driver